Thomas Beasley may refer to:
Thomas D. Beasley (1904–1988), Florida politician
Thomas W. Beasley (born 1943), Tennessee politician and businessman
Tom Beasley (born 1954), American football player